Azerbaijanis in Turkmenistan are part of the Azerbaijani diaspora. They are Turkmen citizens and permanent residents of ethnic Azerbaijani background. Azerbaijan and Turkmenistan used to be part of the Russian Empire and later the Soviet Union. As of 1989, there were 33,365 Azerbaijanis in Turkmenistan.

Demographics

Notable people
 Hajibala Abutalybov, Mayor of Baku (2001-2018)
 Ataya Aliyeva, Azerbaijani actress
 Tahir Baghirov, National Hero of Azerbaijan
 Rolan Guliyev, kickboxer; World Champion version WPKA (2009); Champion of 2004 Asian Kickboxing; Turkmenistan champion 2004 kickboxing among professionals; two-time champion in kickboxing Azerbaijan (2005 and 2006) among young people
 Natavan Habibi, Azerbaijani pop singer
 Elnur Hüseynov, one of the two singers who represented Azerbaijan in the Eurovision Song Contest 2008
 Azhdar Ibrahimov, Azerbaijani Soviet film director
 Fakhraddin Musayev, National Hero of Azerbaijan
 Ramiz Mustafayev, Azerbaijani composer and conductor
 Tahira Tahirova, Minister of Foreign Affairs of Azerbaijan SSR (1959–1983)

See also  
Azerbaijan–Turkmenistan relations
Turkic Council
Demographics of Turkmenistan

References

Notes

External links 
Soviet Census 1970: Turkmenistan
Soviet Census 1979: Turkmenistan
Soviet Census 1989: Turkmenistan

Ethnic groups in Turkmenistan
Azerbaijani diaspora
Azerbaijan–Turkmenistan relations